Cape Breton fiddling is a regional violin style which falls within the Celtic music idiom.  Cape Breton Island's fiddle music was brought to North America by Scottish immigrants during the Highland Clearances. These Scottish immigrants were primarily from Gaelic-speaking regions in the Scottish Highlands and the Outer Hebrides.  Although fiddling has changed considerably since this time in Scotland, it is widely held that the tradition of Scottish fiddle music has been better preserved in Cape Breton.

Dance styles associated with the music are Cape Breton step dancing, Cape Breton square dancing (Iona style and Inverness style), and highland dancing.

In 2005, as a tribute to the area's traditional music, the construction of a tourism center and the world's largest fiddle and bow was completed on the waterfront in Sydney, Nova Scotia.

Playing style
Cape Breton playing is highly accented, characterized by driven up-bowing.  The tunes of other music origins (Irish, Canadian, French-Canadian, etc.) sound quite different when performed by Cape Breton players.  The strong downbeat pulse is driven by the fiddler's heel into the floor. The pattern tends to be heel-and-toe on reels, the heel on strathspeys.

Cape Breton fiddle music is strongly influenced by the intonations of the Scots-Gaelic language, especially Puirt a Beul (mouth music) and strathspeys. The ornaments are adapted from those used on the Great Highland bagpipe. The ornamentation (cuts aka. trebles, drones and doubling) brings out the strong feeling of Cape Breton fiddle.

A century ago the violin and pump organ were the common instruments; the latter has been supplanted by piano.

Repertoire
The types of tunes commonly associated with Cape Breton fiddling are jigs, reels, marches, strathspeys, clogs (hornpipes), and slow airs.  Many of the tunes associated with Cape Breton fiddle music are also commonly performed on other instruments, especially bagpipes, piano and guitar.  It is not unheard of for the music to be performed on harmonica, tin whistle, mandolin or banjo.

Modern Cape Breton players draw on a large body of music, from the Scottish and Irish traditions, and from modern compositions.  Several older books of tune collections have been particularly popular sources:

Fraser, Simon (1874), Simon Fraser Collection
MacDonald, Keith Norman (1887), The Skye Collection
MacQuarrie, Gordan F. (1940), The Cape Breton Collection
O'Neill, Francis (1903), O'Neill's Music Of Ireland
Robertson, James Stewart (1884), The Athole Collection
Skinner, James Scott, The Scottish Violinist
Skinner, James Scott, The Harp and Claymore

A number of recent publications also document a substantial amount of the modern Cape Breton repertoire:

Beaton, Kinnon (2000), The Beaton Collection (compositions of Kinnon, Donald Angus, and Andrea Beaton)
Cameron, John Donald (2000), The Heather Hill Collection (compositions of Dan R. MacDonald)
Cameron, John Donald (1994), The Trip To Windsor Collection (compositions of Dan R. MacDonald, volume 2)
Cranford, Paul (2007), The Cape Breton Fiddlers Collection
Cranford, Paul (1997), Winston Fitzgerald:  A Collection of Fiddle Tunes
Dunlay, Kate, and David Greenberg (1996), The Dungreen Collection - Traditional Celtic Violin Music of Cape Breton
Holland, Jerry (1988, several revised editions), Jerry Holland's Collection of Fiddle Tunes
Holland, Jerry (2000), Jerry Holland:  The Second Collection
MacEachern, Dan Hugh (1975), MacEachern's Collection
Ruckert, George (2009), John Campbell: A Cape Breton Legacy
Stubbert, Brenda (1994), Brenda Stubbert's Collection of Fiddle Tunes
Stubbert, Brenda (2007), Brenda Stubbert: The Second Collection

See also 
 Canadian fiddle
 The Barra MacNeils
 Slainte Mhath
 Violin musical styles—fiddle
 Music of Nova Scotia
 Music of Canada's Maritimes
 Gaelic College of Celtic Arts and Crafts
 Dan R. MacDonald
 Ashley MacIsaac
 Winston "Scotty" Fitzgerald

References

Further reading 
 MacGillivray, Allister (1981), The Cape Breton Fiddler, College of Cape Breton Press. .

External links
Kimberley Fraser's Fiddle Blog Cape Breton Fiddler Kimberley Fraser discusses issues relevant to Cape Breton fiddle music.

19th-century music genres
20th-century music genres
21st-century music genres
Canadian Celtic music
Canadian Gaelic
Cape Breton Island
Celtic music
Irish styles of music
Nova Scotia music
Scottish styles of music
Violins

Folk music genres